Peta strana sveta (trans. Fifth Side of the World) is the fifth studio album from Serbian and Yugoslav hard rock band Kerber, released in 1990.

Background and recording
Peta strana sveta was recorded in PGP-RTB Studio V and produced by Saša Habić. Most of the album lyrics were written by the band's old associate Duško Arsenijević, and part of the lyrics were written by Riblja Čorba frontman Bora Đorđević, with whom the band had previously cooperated on their third studio album, Seobe (Migrations). Đorđević wrote lyrics for two songs, co-wrote lyrics for one song with Arsenijević, and also sung backing vocals on the album recording. Several songs featured Nenad Petrović on saxophone and the song "Mama – tata" ("Mom – Dad") featured a children's choir. Peta strana sveta was the band's only album to feature a song not composed by the members of the band – the song "Ljubav je", composed by Dragoljub Ilić, keyboardist of the band Generacija 5. The album cover was designed by Zoran Stamenković, the band's original drummer.

Peta strana sveta was the band's last album recorded with drummer Dragoljub Đuričić and bass guitarist Branko Isaković. Đuričić would leave the band soon after the album recording, being replaced by Josip Hartl, and Isaković would remain with the band until their early 1990s hiatus, being replaced by Saša Vasković when the band returned to the scene in the mid-1990s.

Track listing

Personnel
Goran Šepa - vocals
Tomislav Nikolić - guitar, backing vocals
Branislav Božinović - keyboard, backing vocals
Branko Isaković - bass guitar, acoustic guitar, backing vocals
Dragoljub Đuričić - drums

Additional personnel
Nenad Petrović - saxophone
Bora Đorđević - backing vocals
Marijana Popović - backing vocals
Vesna Popović - backing vocals
Children choir Družionica Maštaonica (on track 1)
Saša Habić - producer, recorded by, backing vocals
Zoran Vukčević - recorded by
Kamenko Pajić - photography
Michael Waschak - photography

Legacy
In 2021, the song "Igraj sad" was ranked 5th on the list of 100 Greatest Yugoslav Hard & Heavy Anthems published by web magazine Balkanrock.

Covers
Serbian hard rock/heavy metal band Atlantida recorded a cover of the song "Igraj sad" on their 2009 album Put u večnost (Road to Eternity).

References

External links
Peta strana sveta at Discogs

Kerber albums
1990 albums
PGP-RTB albums